Gilles le Vinier (died 1252) was a trouvère from a middle-class family of Arras. He was the younger brother of fellow trouvère Guillaume le Vinier. He entered the church and served as a canon at Arras, where he was the church's legal representative between 1225 and 1234, and at Lille. At Arras he created several benefices between 1236 and 1246. His last one was founded on the death of his brother. In his song Aler m'estuet la ou je trerai paine he mentions making a pilgrimage to the Holy Land. The records of Arras Cathedral note that a requiem was held for Gilles, called Dominus Aegidius (Lord Gilles), on 13 November 1252.

Gilles composed at least seven songs that have survived. Both Amors ki me le comande and Au partir de la froidure possess "echo rhymes", which is to say that the final syllables of a verse are repeated, with a change in meaning, at the start of the next. His melodies are standard. He composed a lai–descort of ten stanzas.

List of songs
Chansons courtoises
Aler m'estuet la ou je trerai paine
Amors ki le me comande
Au partir de la froidure
Beaus m'est prins tans au partir de fevrier

Lai–descort
A ce m'acort

Jeux-partis
Frere, ki fait mieus a prisier
Maistre Simon, d'un essample nuvel

References
Elizabeth Aubrey. "Gilles le Vinier." Grove Music Online. Oxford Music Online. Accessed 20 September 2008. 
Contains musical excerpt from Au partir de la froidure with the score, showing the "echo rhyme".

Trouvères
1252 deaths
Year of birth unknown
Male classical composers